Olios greeni, is a species of spider of the genus Olios. It is endemic to Sri Lanka.

See also
 List of Sparassidae species

References

Sparassidae
Endemic fauna of Sri Lanka
Spiders of Asia
Spiders described in 1901